Alborov (masculine) or Alborova (feminine) is a Russian surname. Notable people with the surname include:

Alan Alborov (born 1989), Russian footballer
Igor Alborov (born 1982), Uzbekistani boxer
Mirza Alborov (born 1987), Russian footballer
Ruslan Alborov (born 1983), Russian footballer

Russian-language surnames